The ladder snake (Zamenis scalaris) is a species of non-venomous snake in the family Colubridae. The species is endemic to southwestern Europe.

Distribution
The geographic range of the ladder snake includes Portugal, Spain, southern France and just into Italy, also Menorca and the Iles d'Hyères off Provence, but it is absent from northern Iberia including much of the Pyrenees, Galicia (although the species is found on Ons Island, in the Atlantic Islands of Galicia National Park), Cantabria and the Basque Country.  The population on Menorca may stem from an introduction by humans.

Habitat
The Ladder Snake enjoys scrub bushy cover, including orchards, vineyards, hedges and overgrown dry-stone walls; it is common in the maquis. Habitats with stones and boulders and low shade are preferred.

Description
The ladder snake is a medium-sized snake which reaches a maximum total length (including tail) of around  but which averages . It has a pointed snout.  As an adult the ladder snake is less variable than many related snake species, the basic colour goes from yellowish to dark brown,  with two darker stripes running down the length of the body from neck to tail. It normally also has a dark stripe running from the rear of the eye to the angle of the jaw and sometime subtle, darker markings on the sides. The ventral side is pale, varying from a silvery-grey to whitish, with the occasional dark spot. The eye is dark. The juvenile snakes have lighter and brighter colouration, varying from yellow to light brown, with the characteristic “ladder” pattern picked out in black along the upperside. The pale underside has black markings which sometimes coalesce to cover the whole of the underside. As the snake ages these colours and patterns fade until the simpler adult pattern is left.

Food
The majority of its prey is, like other “rat snakes”, mammals such as mice, rabbits and shrews, making up 75% of prey items with a further quarter being spiders, insects (especially grasshoppers) and a few birds. To prey on birds the ladder snake will climb to search for active nests in trees or on man-made structures. Lizards are also eaten. Juveniles prefer small lizards, baby rodents, spiders, and grasshoppers.

Behaviour
The ladder snake is normally active by day, but during the hottest summer months it may be nocturnal, while in the spring months it may be more crepuscular. Its behaviour is said to be more like that of whipsnakes rather than that of rat snakes. It is more aggressive and defensive than most of the species formerly classified alongside it in the genus Elaphe. Defensive signals include hissing and lunging forward with the mouth open. Any attempt to pick up a ladder snake may be greeted by sharp bites and also the emptying of the cloacal glands, releasing an offensive odour.

It is a more mobile snake than many of its relatives and movements of up to 100 m per day have been recorded, while the average home territory of an individual is 4,500 m2. Adults may enter barns or similar buildings in search of rodent prey, but they do not normally use such places for shelter and prefer rodent burrows, piles of stones or hollow trees.

Breeding
In Iberia courtship occurs during May and June, however some females do not breed every year. Copulation lasts around an hour, and a clutch with an average size of 15 eggs (varies between 4 and 24 eggs) is laid 3–6 weeks after mating. Incubation takes between 5 and 12 weeks. The young measure 20 cm long as hatchlings. Unusually for snakes, their mother may remain with the newly hatched juveniles for a few days. Males and females reach sexual maturity at approximately 5 years of age, when they reach a length of 50 and 65 cm, respectively.

Conservation status
The IUCN has rated this species as Least Concern. This is a generally abundant species which is tolerant of a wide range of habitats and has a large geographic range.

Gallery

References

External links
Rhinechis scalaris Information Sheet

Further reading
Arnold EN, Burton JA (1978). A Field Guide to the Reptiles and Amphibians of Britain and Europe. London: Collins. 272 pp. + Plates 1–40. . (Elaphe scalaris, pp. 200–201 + Plate 36 + Map 113).
Boulenger GA (1894). Catalogue of the Snakes in the British Museum (Natural History). Volume II., Containing the Conclusion of the Colubridæ Aglyphæ. London: Trustees of the British Museum (Natural History). (Taylor and Francis, printers). xxi + 382 pp. + Plates I-XX. (Coluber scalaris, pp. 65–66).
Schinz HR (1822). Das Thierreich eingetheilt nach dem Bau der Thiere als Grundlage ihrer Naturgeschichte und der vergleichenden Anatomie von dem Herrn Ritter von Cuvier. Zweiter Band [Volume 2]. Reptilien, Fische, Weichthiere, Ringelwürmer. Stuttgart and Tübingen: J.G. Cotta. xvi + 835 pp. (Coluber scalaris, new species, p. 123). (in German).

Zamenis
Reptiles described in 1822
Taxonomy articles created by Polbot